Torrefazione Italia is a high-end brand of Starbucks coffee beans sold in grocery stores. It started out as its own coffeehouse chain before being acquired by Starbucks in 2003.

History 
The first Torrefazione Italia café opened in Seattle, Washington in 1986. Espresso, coffee and baked goods were served in their cafés.

Umberto Bizzarri, Torrefazione's founder, teamed up with Stewart Brother's Coffee (later renamed Seattle's Best Coffee) founder, Jim Stewart, in the mid-1980s to create Seattle Coffee Holdings. This new company built a more modern roasterie on Vashon Island, Washington in 1995 and manufactured Seattle's Best Coffee and Torrefazione Italia Coffee. Seattle Coffee Holdings was purchased in 1998 by AFC Enterprises and renamed Seattle Coffee Company.

Torrefazione Italia expanded to other cities in North America, notably, Vancouver BC, the San Francisco Bay Area, Portland, Boston, Chicago, and Dallas. Their coffees are also wholesaled to restaurants, hotels, bakeries and cafés.

Starbucks, another Seattle-based coffee company, purchased Torrefazione Italia along with Seattle's Best Coffee in 2003. Starbucks announced in 2005 that all 17 Torrefazione Italia cafés would be closed before the end of the year, and all of the San Francisco retail locations were closed on 27 October 2005. The coffee brand has been retained, however, and the coffee is available throughout the United States in coffee shops, hotels, resorts, offices, schools, hospitals, and elsewhere.

Products

Whole Bean 
Perugia
Montecatini Decaf

Ground Portion Pack 
Napoli
Montecatini Decaf

Caffè Umbria
The Bizzarri family has since started another roaster and coffee chain, Caffè Umbria, which was established by third-generation roaster Emanuele Bizzarri, the son of Umberto. Umbria has been roasting since 2002, and opened its first retail branch in Seattle in 2005, following Starbucks' decision to shutter the Torrefazione cafés. The first Umbria branch is in fact in the same location as the first Torrefazione Italia branch, located at 320 Occidental Avenue in Pioneer Square. Caffè Umbria's main roastery is in the South Park neighborhood of Seattle and in 2017 opened a second roastery in the Bucktown neighborhood of Chicago. As of May 2021 the chain operates across 4 cities: four cafes in Seattle—-three downtown and one in the Ballard neighborhood; three in Portland, Oregon—-one in the city's Pearl District, and two downtown; two in Chicago—-one in the Bucktown roastery and one in the River North Neighborhood; and one in South Beach, Miami. The roasted coffee is sold wholesale to hotels, cafes, restaurants, and grocery stores across the US and Canada.

See also

 List of coffeehouse chains

References

1986 establishments in Washington (state)
1998 mergers and acquisitions
2003 mergers and acquisitions
Coffee brands
Coffeehouses and cafés in the United States
Coffee in Seattle
Companies based in Seattle
Restaurants established in 1986
Restaurants in Seattle
Starbucks